Moueix is a surname that may refer to the following:

 Christian Moueix, French winemaker and son of Jean-Pierre Moueix
 Edouard Moueix, grandson of Jean-Pierre Moueix, manager of Château Bélair-Monange
 Jean-François Moueix, son of Jean-Pierre Moueix and administrator of Château Pétrus
 Jean-Pierre Moueix, French winemaker